Sergei Anatolievich Savin (born 1985) (in Russian Сергей Анатольевич Савин) is a Russian singer who on June 11, 2011 won the Russian reality television singing competition Faktor A based on the X Factor series with the other finalist Erkin Holmatov coming as runner-up. Savin competed in the category "Over 25s" and was coached by judge Boris Krasnov.

References

The X Factor winners
Living people
1985 births
21st-century Russian singers
21st-century Russian male singers